Joseph Boinett is a former Inspector General of the National Police Service of the Republic of Kenya. Prior to his appointment, he served in the Kenyan National Intelligence Service. He is a holder of an International Studies and Diplomacy degree from the Washington International University, an unaccredited institution in the British Virgin Islands. He replaced David Kimaiyo.

References

Living people
Kenyan police officers
Year of birth missing (living people)
People using unaccredited degrees